Eugene Angier Bessom (1855–1913) was a Massachusetts pharmacist and politician who served in both branches of the Massachusetts legislature, and as the 27th Mayor of Lynn, Massachusetts.

See also
 116th Massachusetts General Court (1895)

Notes

1855 births
1913 deaths
Mayors of Lynn, Massachusetts
Republican Party Massachusetts state senators
Republican Party members of the Massachusetts House of Representatives
People from Lynn, Massachusetts